Robert P. Ravenstahl, Sr. (December 31, 1924 – September 1, 2015) was a Democratic member of the Pennsylvania House of Representatives.

Ravenstahl served in the United States Marine Corps during World War II. He then was a member of the Pittsburgh Fire Department. Ravenstahl served on the Pittsburgh City Council. His grandson, Luke Ravenstahl, was the Mayor of Pittsburgh from September 2006 to January 2014. Robert Ravenstahl died at the age of 90 on September 1, 2015. He was sworn into the House on November 17, 1975 and held office until 1978.

References

Pittsburgh City Council members
Democratic Party members of the Pennsylvania House of Representatives
1924 births
2015 deaths
Politicians from Pittsburgh
United States Marine Corps personnel of World War II